is a Japanese upmarket grocery store chain. Its headquarters are in Kyōbashi, Chūō, Tokyo. It is also a major wholesale distributor.

Overview
Meidi-Ya has 14 locations in Greater Tokyo (mostly in upscale Shitamachi districts), 7 stores in other parts of Japan, and two stores in Singapore. , the chain was one of the principal purveyors of the Japanese royal family.

The English name Meidi-ya is the Nihon-shiki romanization of the Japanese name. Many foreigners in Japan have pronounced the name with a hard "d" instead of a "j". The di romanization is characteristic of Nihon-shiki.

Meidi-Ya specializes in sale and production of food and beverages, importing and exporting of food products, wines and spirits, ship equipment, sale of industrial products, leasing and import of machinery, real estate, etc.

References
 Horvat, Andrew. Japanese Beyond Words: How to Walk and Talk Like a Native Speaker. Stone Bridge Press, 2000. , 9781880656426.
 See: "The Romaji (Roomaji) Conundrum." (Archive) - Excerpt from Horvat's book, which states: "The di ending is typical of Nipponshiki romanization, an earlier version of Kunree that, though hardly remembered, remains with us in the name of the upmarket grocery chain Meidiya, which generations of foreign residents have pronounced with a hard d instead of as "Meijiya.""

Notes

External links
 Meidi-Ya
Meidi-Ya 
 Meidi-Ya Store 
 Meidi-Ya Store 
 Singapore Meidi-Ya

Japanese companies established in 1885
Chūō, Tokyo
Distribution companies based in Tokyo
Department stores of Singapore
Food and drink companies based in Tokyo
Food retailers
Retail companies based in Tokyo